Patti Stiles is an actress, director, author, playwright, teacher and improvisation artist living in Australia.

Biography 
She received her training at Calgary, Alberta's Loose Moose Theatre under Keith Johnstone. It was there she worked with Keith Johnstone in many forms of improvisation.  She performed regularly in Theatresports, Gorilla Theatre and Life Game as well as performing in Keith's plays, directing and performing in the Theatre For Kids program and touring productions.

Stiles moved to Toronto Canada and was the artistic director of Dream Kitchen Theatre, which produced Theatresports.  From there she moved to Edmonton Alberta and was artistic director of Rapid Fire Theatre from 1991 to 1996.  She trained and directed company members such as Mark Meer, Jacob Banigan, Josh Dean, Nathan Fillion, Kevin Gillese. Her directing credits include The Maltese Bodkin which featured Nathan Fillion (in one of his first theatrical roles) receiving an Elizabeth Sterling Haynes Award for Outstanding Fringe Production.  Patti wrote her first Theatre For Young Audiences play, commissioned by the Provincial Museum, called If Whales Could Tell Tales. It received an Elizabeth Sterling Haynes Nomination for Outstanding Production for Theatre for Young Audiences. Along with her Artistic Directorship she was heavily involved in the Edmonton Arts community performing for numerous theatre companies, plus the Edmonton Fringe Festival as actor, director and producer of their opening / closing ceremonies, the Edmonton Street Performers Festival as a roving character artist, director of Women in Comedy or performer in Late Night Madness, volunteer for the Edmonton Folk Festival stage crew, committee member of the Elizabeth Sterling Haynes Awards and even lead the New Year's Eve countdown for the First Night Festival high a top Churchill Square in a bucket crane truck.

Patti was a founding member of Die-Nasty: The Live Improvised Soap Opera (nominated for several Canadian Comedy Awards and winner of the 2006 award for Best Improv Troupe) and holds the record as the first female improviser to improvise 53 hours straight in the annual Die-Nasty Soap-A-Thon.

Stiles lived in London UK for a short period; during this time she worked with many of the impro companies in London. There she trained Deborah Frances-White and Tom Salinsky founders of The Spontaneity Shop and authors of The Impro Handbook, which includes a dedication to her.

Stiles moved to Melbourne and became the artistic director of Impro Melbourne from 2004 to 2009 and again 2014–2019.  During this time she wrote her second theatre for young audiences play Water of Life. She tours internationally performing and teaching improvisation to theatre companies around the world.

She authored her first book Improvise Freely in 2021.

Stiles has performed improvisation all over the world and has worked with such actors Colin Mochrie, Brad Sherwood, Wayne Brady, Joe Flaherty, Josie Lawrence, Peder Falk, Helge Skoog, Cariad Llyod, Pippa Evans, Ruth Bratt, Peter Spellos, Daniel Cordeaux, Rebecca De Unamuno, Julia Zemiro, Dan O'Connor, Edi Patterson, Ron Pederson, Jeff Haslam, Dana Andersen, Joe Bill and Alan Cox (actor).

She is a three-time nominee for the Elizabeth Sterling Haynes Award for Theatre Excellence. TV credits for Stiles include Neighbours (AUS), Stingers (AUS), "John Safran's Race Relation's" (AUS).

References

External links 
 Patti Stiles
 Impro Melbourne
 Rapid Fire Theatre
 Die-Nasty homepage
 Interview

Living people
Year of birth missing (living people)
Australian actresses